Woodman's may refer to:
Woodman's Markets a grocery store in Wisconsin and Illinois
Woodman's of Essex a restaurant in Essex, Massachusetts